Anthony Alfred Volmink (born 10 February 1990) is a South African rugby union player who plays as a wing or fullback for the  in Pro14 on loan from  in the Currie Cup and in the Rugby Challenge.

Volmink made his Super Rugby debut on 2 June 2012 for the Lions against the Sharks in Johannesburg. Volmink started the game before being replaced by Ruan Combrinck in the 61st minute of a 38-28 Lions victory.

On 27 April 2013, Volmink broke the South African tries-per-game record when he scored nine tries in the  161–3 victory over the hapless  in the 2013 Vodacom Cup.

Volmink formerly represented UWC in the Varsity Shield.

References

External links

itsrugby.co.uk profile

Living people
1990 births
South African people of German descent
South African rugby union players
Lions (United Rugby Championship) players
Rugby union wings
People from the Overberg District Municipality
Golden Lions players
Boland Cavaliers players
Southern Kings players
Griquas (rugby union) players
Cheetahs (rugby union) players
Sharks (rugby union) players
Sharks (Currie Cup) players
Rugby union players from the Western Cape